Sarah Lefort (born February 9, 1994) is a Canadian ice hockey player from Quebec,  signed with the Montréal Force of the Premier Hockey Federation (PHF).

Playing career

Hockey Canada

During the 2011–12 Canada women's national ice hockey team season, she was a member of the Canadian National Under 18 team that participated in the 2012 IIHF World Women's U18 Championship. In the gold medal game versus the United States, Lefort scored a goal as Canada claimed the gold by a 3–0 tally.

She was a member of Canada's National Women's Development Team that won a gold medal at the 2015 Nations Cup (formerly known as the Meco Cup).

Professional hockey
In the 2015 NWHL Draft, Lefort was claimed by the Buffalo Beauts. After graduating from Boston University in 2016 as the second-leading scorer in the history of the Boston University Terriers women's ice hockey program, she was the first round pick of Les Canadiennes de Montréal in the 2016 CWHL Draft.

Awards and honours
 2014-15 Hockey East Second Team All-Star

References

External links
 

Living people
1995 births
Boston University Terriers women's ice hockey players
Canadian expatriate ice hockey players in the United States
Canadian ice hockey coaches
Canadian women's ice hockey forwards
Les Canadiennes de Montreal players
Clarkson Cup champions
Ice hockey people from Quebec
Montreal Force players
People from Montérégie
Professional Women's Hockey Players Association players
Stanstead College alumni